Algutsrum is a locality situated in Mörbylånga Municipality, Kalmar County, Sweden with 532 inhabitants in 2010.

Algutsrum Hundred was a hundred of Öland in Sweden.

Born 
 Ramon Pascal Lundqvist (born 10 May 1997), footballer

References

External links

Populated places in Kalmar County
Populated places in Mörbylånga Municipality